The Huancas, Wancas, or Wankas are a Quechua people living in the Junín Region of central Peru, in and around the Mantaro Valley.

Names
The southern branch of Huanca people are called the Wanka Waylla Quechua and Southern Huancayo Quechua. The Jauja Wanka are also called Wanka Jauja Quechua and Shawsha Wanka Quechua people. They gave their name to the Peruvian football team Deportivo Wanka.

History
After fierce fighting, the Huanca people were conquered by Pachacuti and incorporated into the Inca Empire. The Huanca helped the Spaniards during the conquest of Peru. They provided supplies and men to the Spanish army.

Language
The Huanca people speak Jauja Wanka Quechua and Waylla Wanka Quechua, both Quechua I languages. These languages differ significantly from the Incas' Quechua of Cusco. (see Mantaro Valley)

Notes

Quechua
Ethnic groups in Peru
Indigenous peoples in Peru
Indigenous peoples of the Andes
Colonial Peru